Nazem Amine (29 May 1927 – 16 July 2017) was a Lebanese wrestler. He competed in the men's freestyle lightweight at the 1960 Summer Olympics.

References

External links
 

1927 births
2017 deaths
Lebanese male sport wrestlers
Olympic wrestlers of Lebanon
Wrestlers at the 1960 Summer Olympics
People from Zahle